The Lone Star Football League (LSFL) was a regional professional indoor football minor league that played three seasons from 2012 to 2014. All of the LSFL's charter teams were based in the state of Texas, with five teams coming from the Southern Indoor Football League, three from the Indoor Football League, plus one expansion team. The LSFL played three seasons to completion before merging with the Champions Professional Indoor Football League in August 2014 to form Champions Indoor Football.

History

2012 season
The 2012 season began with the Houston Stallions, Amarillo Venom, Rio Grande Valley Magic, Laredo Rattlesnakes, West Texas Roughnecks, Corpus Christi Hammerheads, and Abilene Ruff Riders participating. While a number of the other teams scheduled to launch in 2012 did not make it to the start of the regular season, only the Mesquite Bandits had their franchise revoked rather than fold voluntarily. The Houston team was 7–0 when it folded halfway through the season. The Amarillo Venom finished the regular season 10–4 and went on to defeat the Rio Grande Valley Magic 62–40 in the LSFL championship game.
Former Clemson linebacker Antonio Clay was practicing with the West Texas Roughnecks in Odessa, Texas in 2012.

2013 season
For 2013, the LSFL played with just five teams. Amarillo, Laredo, Corpus Christi, and Abilene (now known as the Bombers) returned from the 2012 season. The league added two new teams; the expansion San Angelo Bandits and the New Mexico Stars (formerly of the Indoor Football League and the LSFL's first and only team outside of Texas). The league announced in October that the Corpus Christi Hammerheads had been removed from the league due to its ownership violating by-laws. The Amarillo Venom defeated the Laredo Rattlesnakes 70–69 to repeat as league champions. After the season, in late September 2013, the Laredo franchise announced it was ceasing operations due to the financial and legal difficulties of its owner.

2014 season
With the Laredo and Abilene franchises failing to return, the LSFL added the West Texas Wildcatters in Odessa and the Rio Grande Valley Sol in Hidalgo to the league.

Merger with the CPIFL
On August 14, 2014, it was announced at the league website that they merged with the Champions Professional Indoor Football League to create what they say is the largest indoor football league in the country. The merged league became known as Champions Indoor Football.

Teams

 Abilene Bombers – played in LSFL during the 2012 and 2013 seasons
 Corpus Christi Hammerheads – played in LSFL for 2012 season, franchise revoked by league for multiple violations of league bylaws
 Frisco Falcons – announced for the 2012 season but folded before the schedule was released
 Houston Stallions – Due to the resignations of its general manager and staff, the Stallions were unable to complete the 2012 season
 Laredo Rattlesnakes – played in LSFL during the 2012 and 2013 seasons
 Mesquite Bandits – originally set to play in inaugural 2012 season, franchise revoked by league before season started for lack of preparations for inaugural season as well as breach of franchise agreement
 New Mexico Stars – played in LSFL for 2013 and 2014 seasons
 Rio Grande Valley Magic – played in LSFL for 2012 season, franchise revoked by league for multiple violations of league bylaws
 West Texas Roughnecks – played in LSFL for 2012 season, folded after new ownership could not be found

Franchising
The LSFL required a $25,000 franchise fee to join, as well as a $25,000 letter of credit.

References

(Clemson) Antonio Clay WTX Roughnecks waiver LSFL 2012  https://web.archive.org/web/20120402113053/http://www.texaslsfl.com/news/daily-transactions.html

 
Defunct indoor American football leagues in the United States
Sports leagues established in 2011
2011 establishments in Texas
Sports leagues disestablished in 2014
2014 establishments in Texas